Speaker of the House of Representatives may refer to:

National governments
 Speaker of the House of Representatives of Antigua and Barbuda
 Speaker of the Australian House of Representatives
 Speaker of the House of Representatives of Belize
Speaker of the House of Representatives of Burma
 Speaker of the House of Representatives of Egypt
 Speaker of the House of Representatives of Fiji
 Speaker of the House of Representatives of Grenada
 Speaker of the House of Representatives of Jamaica
 Speaker of the House of Representatives of Japan
 Speaker of the House of Representatives of Liberia
 Speaker of the House of Representatives of Malta
 Speaker of the New Zealand House of Representatives
 Speaker of the Nigerian House of Representatives
 Speaker of the Philippine House of Representatives
 Speaker of the House of Representatives of Somaliland
 Speaker of the House of Representatives of Thailand
 Speaker of the House of Representatives of Trinidad and Tobago
 Speaker of the United States House of Representatives

U.S. state governments
 Speaker of the Alabama House of Representatives
 Speaker of the Alaska House of Representatives
 Speaker of the Arizona House of Representatives
 Speaker of the Arkansas House of Representatives
 Speaker of the California House of Representatives
 Speaker of the Colorado House of Representatives
 Speaker of the Connecticut House of Representatives
 Speaker of the Delaware House of Representatives
 Speaker of the Florida House of Representatives
 Speaker of the Georgia House of Representatives
 Speaker of the Hawaii House of Representatives
 Speaker of the Idaho House of Representatives
 Speaker of the Illinois House of Representatives
 Speaker of the Indiana House of Representatives
 Speaker of the Iowa House of Representatives
 Speaker of the Kansas House of Representatives
 Speaker of the Kentucky House of Representatives
 Speaker of the Louisiana House of Representatives
 Speaker of the Maine House of Representatives
 Speaker of the Massachusetts House of Representatives
 Speaker of the Michigan House of Representatives
 Speaker of the Minnesota House of Representatives
 Speaker of the Mississippi House of Representatives
 Speaker of the Missouri House of Representatives
 Speaker of the Montana House of Representatives
 Speaker of the Nebraska House of Representatives
 Speaker of the Nevada House of Representatives
 Speaker of the New Hampshire House of Representatives
 Speaker of the New Jersey House of Representatives
 Speaker of the New Mexico House of Representatives
 Speaker of the New York House of Representatives
 Speaker of the North Carolina House of Representatives
 Speaker of the North Dakota House of Representatives
 Speaker of the Ohio House of Representatives
 Speaker of the Oklahoma House of Representatives
 Speaker of the Oregon House of Representatives
 Speaker of the Pennsylvania House of Representatives
 Speaker of the Rhode Island House of Representatives
 Speaker of the South Carolina House of Representatives
 Speaker of the South Dakota House of Representatives
 Speaker of the Tennessee House of Representatives
 Speaker of the Texas House of Representatives
 Speaker of the Utah House of Representatives
 Speaker of the Vermont House of Representatives
 Speaker of the Virginia House of Representatives
 Speaker of the Washington House of Representatives
 Speaker of the Wyoming House of Representatives

US Territories, etc.
 Speaker of the Northern Mariana Islands House of Representatives
 Speaker of the House of Representatives of Puerto Rico

See also
 Speaker (politics)
 List of legislatures by country